Francis Arthur "Pug" Griffin (April 24, 1896 – October 12, 1951) was a Major League Baseball player.

Griffin continued to play in the minor leagues until . In , he became a player-manager, taking over the Omaha Crickets. He continued to manage on and off in the minors until the year of his death, winning a pair of league championships along the way.

Sources

Major League Baseball first basemen
Major League Baseball outfielders
Philadelphia Athletics players
New York Giants (NL) players
St. Louis Browns scouts
Baltimore Orioles (IL) players
Memphis Chickasaws players
Omaha Buffaloes players
Dallas Steers players
Des Moines Demons players
Wichita Falls Spudders players
Oakland Oaks (baseball) players
Omaha Packers players
Pueblo Braves players
Minor league baseball managers
Baseball players from Nebraska
Sportspeople from Lincoln, Nebraska
1896 births
1951 deaths